Dubai Hills Mall is a retail, leisure, and entertainment complex situated in Dubai, United Arab Emirates. Located in the Dubai Hills Estate, at an intersection between Al Khail and Umm Suqeim. Dubai Hills Estate constitutes as one of the first stages in the development of Mohammed bin Rashid City (MBR City) and Dubai Hills Mall will be the primary regional mall in the area. The mall opened on 17 February 2022.

Background
Dubai Hills Mall is owned and operated by Emaar Malls, a subsidiary of Emaar Properties. Emaar Malls is responsible for the construction of The Dubai Mall, the largest shopping centre in the world by total area. Plans for the Dubai Hills Mall were announced in August 2017 and the completion date was planned for late 2019. It actually opened in 2022.

Development
This will be used as space for 750 retail and dining outlets. The mall will be accessible from Umm Suqeim Road and Al Khail Road.

Location
Dubai Hills Mall is situated in the development, Dubai Hills Estate. Within the immediate vicinity, there are numerous residential developments, an 18-hole championship golf course, Dubai Hills Park and Dubai Hills Boulevard. Its prominent road links, inclusive of Umm Suqeim Street and Al Khail Road, means it can be accessed from Downtown Dubai, Dubai Marina and the residential enclaves of Emirates Hills and Arabian Ranches.

Features

Design
Current plans for the Dubai Hills Mall show that it will be based around a central courtyard, from which a series of interconnected streetscapes branch out. Its layout is designed to offer easy orientation and provide a clear focus on the central courtyard. This space will be used for events and special features in the future.

Retail
Dubai Hills Mall will consist of approximately 650 retail and dining outlets spread over two levels. Three ‘pocket parks’ are included in the design, providing space for dining facilities, leisure activities, and community events. A large skylight canopy will act as a projection screen for advertising purposes and during events.

Leisure
Dubai Hills Mall is one of the latest retail projects by Emaar. 4 major entertainment and leisure complexes are planned for construction, including a 17-screen cinema complex and an outdoor concert arena.

See also
 Dubai Hills
 Emaar Properties

References

2022 establishments in the United Arab Emirates
Shopping malls established in 2022
Year of establishment missing
Shopping malls in Dubai